Porcellionides buddelundi is a woodlouse found in Portugal and Spain.

References

Porcellionidae
Crustaceans described in 1901
Woodlice of Europe